Nakh Ab (also Romanized as Nakh Āb) is a village in Miyandasht Rural District, in the Central District of Darmian County, South Khorasan Province, Iran. At the 2006 census, its population was 124, in 32 families.

References 

Populated places in Darmian County